Joe Paul may refer to:

 Joe C. Paul (1946–1965), United States Marine and Medal of Honor recipient
 Joe Paul (footballer) (1904–1962), Australian rules footballer
 Joe Paul (lyricist), Indian lyricist and music composer